Jovana Risović (born 7 October 1993) is a Serbian handball player for RK Krim and the Serbian national team.

She won the Danish Cup with Randers HK.

She was a top goalkeeper of the 2012 Women's Junior World Handball Championship.

References

External links

1993 births
Living people
Serbian female handball players
Handball players from Belgrade
Mediterranean Games gold medalists for Serbia
Competitors at the 2013 Mediterranean Games
Expatriate handball players
Serbian expatriate sportspeople in Croatia
Serbian expatriate sportspeople in Denmark
Serbian expatriate sportspeople in Slovenia
Universiade medalists in handball
Mediterranean Games medalists in handball
Universiade bronze medalists for Serbia
Medalists at the 2015 Summer Universiade
RK Podravka Koprivnica players